The fifteenth government of Israel was formed by Golda Meir on 15 December 1969 following the October elections. The government was a continuation of the national unity government formed during the previous Knesset, and consisted of the Alignment, Gahal, the National Religious Party, the Independent Liberals and the Israeli Arab parties Progress and Development and Cooperation and Brotherhood. Gahal left the coalition in early August 1970 after the government agreed to accept the Rogers Plan.

The government remained in place until 10 March 1974, when the sixteenth government took power following the December 1973 elections. It is notable for being the first government to last a full four-year Knesset term, and the first to include any non-Jewish members; On 24 May 1971 Meir appointed Abd el-Aziz el-Zoubi as Deputy Minister of Health, making him the first Israeli Arab to join the cabinet. In November that year, Druze MK Jabr Muadi also joined the cabinet as Deputy Minister of Communications.

Cabinet members

1 Although Barzilai, Shem-Tov, Peled were not MKs at the time all had previously been MKs for Mapam, one of the constituents of the Alignment.

2 Died in office.

3 All National Religious Party MKs except Haim-Moshe Shapira and Michael Hasani resigned from the Knesset upon being appointed to the cabinet.

4 Yaakov-Shimshon Shapira was out of office between 13 June and 12 September 1972.

5 All Independent Liberal MKs resigned from the Knesset upon being appointed to the cabinet.

6 Bar-Lev was later an MK for the Alignment.

7 Dolchin and Weizman were Gahal members.

8 Goldschmidt was out of office between 16 and 19 July 1970.

References

External links
Seventh Knesset: Government 15 Knesset website

 15
1969 establishments in Israel
1974 disestablishments in Israel
Cabinets established in 1969
Cabinets disestablished in 1974
1969 in Israeli politics
1970 in Israeli politics
1971 in Israeli politics
1972 in Israeli politics
1973 in Israeli politics
1974 in Israeli politics
 15
 15
Golda Meir